Islam Gymkhana may mean:

 Islam Gymkhana, Mumbai: A gymkhana in Mumbai
 Rander Islam Gymkhana Ground, Surat: A cricket ground in Surat